Prostanthera cuneata, commonly known as alpine mint bush, is a species of flowering plant in the mint family Lamiaceae, and is endemic to mountainous areas of south-eastern continental Australia. It is an erect, compact shrub with egg-shaped leaves with the narrower end towards the base, and pale lavendar to almost white flowers with purple blotches.

Description
Prostanthera cuneata is usually an erect, more or less compact shrub that typically grows to a height of  but often tending to prostrate as it ages. The branches are more or less cylindrical and covered with white hairs. Flowering occurs from November to April.

Taxonomy and naming
Prostanthera cuneata was first formally described in 1848 by botanist George Bentham in de Candolle's treatise Prodromus Systematis Naturalis Regni Vegetabilis. The specific epithet cuneata means "wedge-shaped".

Distribution and habitat
Alpine mint bush occurs in alpine and subalpine closed heath and shrubland in granite-based soils in New South Wales and Victoria, often in association with snow gums (Eucalyptus pauciflora). In Tasmania, the species is listed as "presumed to be extinct" under the state's Threatened Species Protection Act 1995.

Use in horticulture
In cultivation this plant has gained the Royal Horticultural Society's Award of Garden Merit. It has an RHS hardiness rating of H4 (hardy throughout most of the UK, down to -5°/-10 °C) and is suited to USDA hardiness zones 8 to 9.

References

cuneata
Flora of New South Wales
Flora of Victoria (Australia)
Flora of the Australian Capital Territory
Lamiales of Australia
Garden plants
Plants described in 1848
Taxa named by George Bentham